The Southern Jaguars and Lady Jaguars represent Southern University in NCAA intercollegiate athletics. Southern University's 13 athletic teams participate in the Southwestern Athletic Conference (SWAC) which is a part of the NCAA Division I. Football participates in the  Football Championship Subdivision (formerly Division I-AA).

Nickname
Southern University's sports teams nickname is the Jaguars.

Sports sponsored

Baseball

The university's baseball team has won more regular season championships than any other SWAC member. They play their home games at Lee-Hines Field.

Notable players
 Rickie Weeks was the first college player selected in the 2003 Major League Baseball Draft when the Milwaukee Brewers made him their No. 1 pick, the highest a second baseman has ever been drafted in MLB Draft history. Weeks won the Golden Spikes Award, Dick Howser Trophy, and Baseball America College Player of the Year honors as the nation's top collegiate player during the 2003 season.
 Hall of Famer Lou Brock played baseball at Southern University from 1958–1960.

Men's basketball

GSU basketball rivalry
The basketball game against in-state rival Grambling State Tigers at the F.G. Clark Activity Center is annually the highest attended and one of the most anticipated games of the season.

TSU basketball rivalry
Since 2008, Southern and Texas Southern have traditionally been the favorites to compete for the SWAC Championship every season.  The games have become very competitive and highly anticipated by both universities.

Notable players
Avery Johnson, former NBA star who won an NBA title with the San Antonio Spurs, is a 1988 graduate of Southern.  Johnson was named NBA Coach of the Year in 2006 after leading the Dallas Mavericks to the NBA Finals. Bob Love, known as "Butterbean" while at Southern, is the second leading scorer in Chicago Bulls history behind Michael Jordan. Love starred at Southern University between 1962–1965.

Women's basketball

The 2005–2006 women's basketball team won a share of the SWAC regular season title and won the SWAC women's basketball tournament.  This was Coach Sandy Pugh's third appearance in the NCAA tournament with the university.

Football

Bayou Classic
Every Thanksgiving weekend, Southern plays in-state archrival Grambling State University in the Bayou Classic at the Mercedes-Benz Superdome in New Orleans. The game is a national primetime telecast on NBC. Due to Hurricane Katrina, the 2005 game was moved to Reliant Stadium in Houston, Texas.

Homecoming
The homecoming football game is always a sold-out game of 25,000+ against a SWAC opponent.  The football game is annually the last major event of homecoming week.

Jackson State Rivalry
The Southern Jaguars maintains a very popular and heated football rivalry with SWAC East foe Jackson State University. The Jackson State–Southern University rivalry game is one of the highest attended and most anticipated games for both schools every year.

Notable players
Mel Blount played running back and cornerback for Southern from 1967–69 before enjoying a 14-year career as a cornerback for the Pittsburgh Steelers. Starring on the Steel Curtain defense, he helped the franchise win four Super Bowl championships in six years. Blount was inducted into the Pro Football Hall of Fame in 1989. Aeneas Demetrius Williams (/əˈniːəs/; (born January 29, 1968) is a former American football player, who played with the Arizona Cardinals and St. Louis Rams of the National Football League (NFL). He played college football for Southern University and was drafted in the third round (59th overall) of the 1991 NFL Draft.[1] Williams was inducted into the Pro Football Hall of Fame in 2014. Aeneas started out as a cornerback then switched to free safety later in his career.  Harold Carmichael also attended Southern University as a tri-sport athlete. He used his 6'8" height to play on the basketball team as a center, and threw the javelin and discus for the track and field team. In football, he shifted to playing wide receiver, where his performance was so outstanding he was inducted into the SWAC Hall of Fame in 2012.[2] He was drafted by the Eagles in the 7th round of the 1971 NFL Draft.[3]

Women's Soccer
The Southern Lady Jaguars soccer team competes in the Southwestern Athletic Conference, which is part of the National Collegiate Athletic Association's Division I. The team plays its home games at Jaguar Park.

Softball
The Southern Lady Jaguars softball team competes in the Southwestern Athletic Conference, which is part of the National Collegiate Athletic Association's Division I. The team plays its home games at Lady Jaguar Field.

Traditions
Southern University's colors are Columbia blue and gold and their fanbase is traditionally referred to as the "Jaguar Nation."

See also
List of NCAA Division I institutions
List of black college football classics

References

External links